M/V American Mariner is a diesel-powered Lake freighter owned and operated by the American Steamship Company (ASC). This vessel was built in 1980 at Bay Shipbuilding Company, Sturgeon Bay, Wisconsin and included self-unloading technology.

History 
The ship was built for American Steamship in 1980 and was originally planned to be named Chicago. The ship was launched August 2, 1979 and named American Mariner for all American seafarers.

References

External links 
 

1979 ships
Great Lakes freighters
Ships built in Sturgeon Bay, Wisconsin